= Fourth Encounter =

1983 video game

Fourth Encounter was a 1983 video game for the VIC-20.

== Reception ==
Morton A. Kevelson for Ahoy said that "The arcade action is very good, with plenty of speed and suitable sound effects." Tony Roberts for Compute! Gazette said that "Fourth Encounter plays very well on the VIC. It is fast, smooth, and colorful." Lynda Skerry for Commodore User called the game "Ideal for latecomers to the galactic battlefront, representing blindingly good value to trigger happy Vic owners, with a two player option thrown in."
